, nicknamed  is a Japanese professional baseball pitcher for the Chiba Lotte Marines of the Nippon Professional Baseball (NPB). He made his NPB debut in 2021.

The Marines chose Sasaki in the first overall selection of the 2019 NPB draft. Taking care to avoid subjecting their rookie to premature physical stresses, the Marines held back until the 2021 season before allowing him to make his NPB debut. He threw a perfect game on April 10, 2022, in which he tied the NPB record for strikeouts in one game and set a new record for consecutive strikeouts.

Early life
Sasaki is from Rikuzentakata in the Iwate Prefecture. He was in the third grade during the 2011 Great East Japan earthquake. The resulting tsunami swept away his house. His father and grandparents died, and Sasaki, his mother, and his two brothers had to live in a nursing home during the recovery. The family moved to Ōfunato the next year and Sasaki began to play baseball at his new school.

Amateur career
Though Sasaki was recruited by other high schools, he chose to attend Ofunato High School to remain with his teammates. He was nicknamed "the Monster of the Reiwa Era" because of his  fastball in high school, His fastball velocity broke the Japanese high school record set by Shohei Ohtani, and Sasaki began to earn comparisons to Ohtani. His nickname is a reference to Daisuke Matsuzaka, who was known as "the Monster of the Heisei Era".

Major League Baseball (MLB) teams hoped that Sasaki would pursue an MLB career, but he opted to remain with his high school team during the Japanese High School Baseball Championship. Sasaki's manager rested him in the qualifying game where Ofunato was eliminated, drawing criticism. Sasaki announced that he would pitch in Nippon Professional Baseball (NPB), declaring for the NPB draft.

Professional career
After four teams attempted to select Sasaki in the 2019 NPB draft, the Chiba Lotte Marines of NPB's Pacific League won the lottery for the rights to the first overall selection, and selected Sasaki. To protect his arm, the Marines did not allow Sasaki to appear in a game during the 2020 season. He made his NPB debut on May 16, 2021. For the 2021 season, Sasaki had a 3–2 win-loss record, a 2.27 earned run average, and 68 strikeouts in  innings pitched across 11 appearances. Sasaki made his postseason debut for the Marines in the 2021 Pacific League Climax Series, striking out 10 batters while allowing one run in six innings, as Lotte defeated the Tohoku Rakuten Golden Eagles.

On April 10, 2022, Sasaki pitched a perfect game against the Orix Buffaloes. It was the 16th perfect game in NPB history, the first since Hiromi Makihara's perfect game in 1994, and the 94th no-hitter in NPB history, the first since August 15, 2020. Sasaki tied the NPB record set by Koji Noda for total strikeouts in one game, with 19, and set a new NPB record for consecutive strikeouts, having struck out 13 batters in a row. This also became a new world record, beating out the 10 consecutive strikeouts achieved in MLB by Corbin Burnes, Tom Seaver, and Aaron Nola.

In his next start, on April 17, Sasaki pitched eight perfect innings against the Hokkaido Nippon-Ham Fighters, before getting taken out from the game before the ninth inning by manager Tadahito Iguchi to protect Sasaki's health. He recorded 14 strikeouts on 102 pitches, including striking out the side in the eighth inning with a 101 mph fastball. Sasaki finished the outing having retired 52 consecutive batters, setting an NPB record. The MLB record for retiring consecutive batters is 46 by Yusmeiro Petit. Sasaki allowed a hit on the first pitch that he threw in his next game, on April 24.

Playing style
In 2022 season, his fastball averaged  as a starter. He also throws a forkball, a curveball, and a slider. The forkball is the best off-speed pitch in his arsenal.

References

External links

2001 births
Living people
Baseball people from Iwate Prefecture
Chiba Lotte Marines players
Japanese baseball players
Nippon Professional Baseball pitchers
Nippon Professional Baseball pitchers who have pitched a perfect game
2023 World Baseball Classic players